Actias parasinensis, the Western Golden moon moth,  is a moth in the family Saturniidae. It is found in Bhutan, India, Thailand, Laos and Vietnam.

The larvae have been recorded feeding on Liquidambar species.

References

Parasinensis
Moths described in 2009
Moths of Asia